Whispering Devils is a 1920 American silent drama film directed by Harry Garson and starring Conway Tearle, Rosemary Theby and Esther Ralston. It is based on the 1896 play Michael and His Lost Angel by the British writer Henry Arthur Jones.

Cast
 Conway Tearle as Rev. Michael Faversham
 Rosemary Theby as Audrey Lesden
 Sam Sothern as Andrew Gibbard
 Esther Ralston as Rose Gibbard
 Warren Millais as Bob
 Lenore Lynard as Mrs. Deane 
 Walter Bytell as Rev. Dockwray
 Hal Wilson as Whitycombe

References

Bibliography
 Goble, Alan. The Complete Index to Literary Sources in Film. Walter de Gruyter, 1999.

External links
 

1920 films
1920 drama films
1920s English-language films
American silent feature films
Silent American drama films
American black-and-white films
Films directed by Harry Garson
1920s American films